Two different automobile lines from Rover have included a Rover 60 model:
 Rover P3, 1948-1949
 Rover P4, 1953-1959

60